Victor Isaac Acosta (born 4 December 1986) is an Argentine footballer.

Club career 
Acosta is a product of the youth system of Buenos Aires club Velez Sarsfield.  In 2005, Acosta moved to Primera B club El Porvenir, but was unable to prevent the club from being relegated to the third tier of Argentine football, the Primera B Metropolitana.  For the 2006–2007 season, he moved to Paraguayan club Rubio Ñú, playing in the Segunda División, the second division of Paraguayan football.  A return to Argentina followed, and Acosta was on the roster of another Primera B club Atlético Tucumán for the 2007–2008 season.  After the conclusion of the 2007–2008 season, a two-year spell at Unión Deportiva Tres Lomas ensued.  His time at Union Deportiva was interrupted in August 2009, when Acosta trialled with Notts County under the supervision of Sven-Göran Eriksson.  The trial ultimately proved unsuccessful, and Acosta returned to Unión Deportiva Tres Lomas.

In July 2010, Acosta signed a one-year contract which would take him offshore to the K-League, as a summer transfer for Daegu FC.  He made his debut as a substitute in a 2 – 0 loss against the Pohang Steelers, and made a further substitute appearance the following week.  Acosta was a starter for the match against Seongnam Ilhwa on 4 September 2010.

In February 2011, the forward was released by Daegu and returned to Argentina. He signed in January 2012 to play for Club Atlético Nueva Chicago.

K League career statistics

References

External links 
Player Record – Spanish

Victor Isaac Acosta at BDFA

1986 births
Living people
Association football midfielders
Argentine expatriate footballers
Argentine footballers
El Porvenir footballers
Club Rubio Ñu footballers
Atlético Tucumán footballers
Daegu FC players
UAI Urquiza players
Nueva Chicago footballers
Deportivo Armenio footballers
Defensores Unidos footballers
Sacachispas Fútbol Club players
K League 1 players
Argentine expatriate sportspeople in South Korea
Argentine expatriate sportspeople in Paraguay
Expatriate footballers in South Korea
Expatriate footballers in Paraguay